Anatoli Nikolayevich Lyz (born February 27, 1943) is a Russian professional football coach.

Career
Born in the Apanasenkovsky District of Stavropol Krai, Lyz played football while studying at university with SKIF Nikolay Nikolayevsk, but was never promoted to the senior side. After he graduated, he began a career as a manager, starting out at DSO Urozhay. He would spend most of his managerial career working in various capacities for clubs and academies in the Kuban region.

Lyz became manager of a new amateur football club, FC Venets Gulkevichi, in 1989, and ultimately led the club through promotion to the Russian Second Division. By 1996, he was appointed manager of FC Zhemchuzhina-2 Sochi also in the Second Division.

References

External links
 Profile on footballfacts
 Career summary by KLISF

1943 births
Living people
Russian football managers
Sportspeople from Stavropol Krai